Houston Hall can refer to:

Houston Hall, a residential hall at Tufts University
Houston Hall (University of Pennsylvania), the student union building at the University of Pennsylvania

Architectural disambiguation pages